The 2016 Southland Conference baseball tournament was held from May 25 through 28.

Seeding and format
The top eight finishers from the regular season, not including Abilene Christian or Incarnate Word, will be seeded one through eight.  They will play a two bracket, double-elimination tournament, with the winner of each bracket meeting in a single championship final.

Every game of the tournament will be broadcast exclusively on ESPN3.

Results

All-Tournament Team
The following players were named to the All-Tournament Team.

Most Valuable Player
Heath Donica was named Tournament Most Valuable Player.  Donica was a junior pitcher for Sam Houston State.

References

Tournament
Southland Conference Baseball Tournament
Baseball in Texas
Southland Conference baseball tournament
Southland Conference baseball tournament